The Man from Home is a 1914 American drama film based on a play written by Booth Tarkington and Harry Leon Wilson. It was directed by Cecil B. DeMille. In 1922, the story was remade in the UK by George Fitzmaurice as The Man From Home, and released by Famous Players-Lasky. The stage play was a big hit for actor William Hodge in the role of Pike in the 1908 Broadway season.

Cast
 Charles Richman as Daniel Voorhees Pike
 Theodore Roberts as The Grand Duke Vaseill
 Fred Montague as Earl Of Hawcastle
 Monroe Salisbury as Hon. Almerce St. Aubyn
 Horace B. Carpenter as Ivanoff
 Jode Mullally as Horace Granger Simpson
 Dick La Reno as Old Man Simpson
 Mabel Van Buren as Ethel Granger Simpson
 Anita King as Helene, Countess De Champigney
 Bob Fleming as Ribiere (as Robert Fleming)
 Jack W. Johnston as Prefect Of Italian Police (aka J. W. Johnston)
 Florence Dagmar as Ivanoff Maid
 Tex Driscoll as Undetermined Role (uncredited)
 James Neill as Officer of Gendarmes (uncredited)

Preservation status
Like many of DeMille's early films, this film is extant, preserved at the Library of Congress.

References

External links

allmovie / synopsis

1914 films
1914 drama films
Silent American drama films
American silent feature films
American black-and-white films
Films directed by Cecil B. DeMille
Films based on works by Booth Tarkington
1910s American films